Glipostenoda monostrigosa is a species of beetle in the genus Glipostenoda. It was described in 1958.

References

monostrigosa
Beetles described in 1958